Rafael Cavalcante (born 5 April 1980) is a Brazilian mixed martial artist who fights in the light heavyweight division. He is currently competing for Bellator MMA. He trains with Anderson Silva and Antônio Rodrigo Nogueira as part of the Black House camp. He formerly competed in Strikeforce, where he was at one time Strikeforce Light Heavyweight Champion. His nickname "Feijão" means "bean" in Portuguese. He holds notable wins over Muhammed "King Mo" Lawal and Yoel Romero.

Background
Cavalcante is from São Paulo, Brazil and began training in Brazilian Jiu-Jitsu at the age of 10. Cavalcante also studied veterinary medicine for five years at the Universidade de Cuiaba - UNIC in his adopted hometown of Cuiaba, Mato Grosso, and it was the legendary Antônio Rodrigo Nogueira who personally convinced Cavalcante's father to allow his son to give up his medical career, in order to focus solely on training for a career in professional fighting under the tutelage of Nogueira. Cavalcante began training at Nogueira's gym daily, alongside the likes of Anderson Silva, André Galvão, and Nogueira's twin brother, Antônio Rogério Nogueira.

Mixed martial arts career

Early career
Cavalcante made his professional mixed martial arts debut in 2006, in the Pantanal Combat tournament, in the State of Mato Grosso, Brazil,  compiling an undefeated record of 3-0 before being signed by the IFL.

IFL
Cavalcante made his promotional debut at IFL: Atlanta, facing veteran Devin Cole whom he defeated via TKO early in the second round. Cavalcante made his next appearance at IFL: Las Vegas, facing fellow Brazilian Márcio Cruz. Cavalcante lost the fight via disqualification in the third round due to illegal upkicks. This was Cavalcante's first professional defeat.

EliteXC
In 2008, Cavalcante began competing for EliteXC, making his debut for the promotion and light heavyweight debut at EliteXC: Street Certified on 16 February 2008, facing John Doyle. Cavalcante won via TKO in the first round.

Cavalcante made his next appearance at EliteXC: Return of the King on 14 June 2008 against veteran Wayne Cole. Cavalcante won via TKO, after knocking down Cole with a series of punches and knees. On 26 July 2008, Cavalcante faced Travis Galbraith, who was given a weeks' notice for the fight, at EliteXC: Unfinished Business. Cavalcante won via knockout in the first round.

Cavalcante was next scheduled to fight for the inaugural EliteXC Light Heavyweight Championship against Cyrille Diabaté in November 2008, but Diabaté pulled out due to an injury, and the event itself was eventually folded as EliteXC closed operations a month before the fight's scheduled date. Cavalcante's contract was later purchased by Strikeforce.

Strikeforce
On 6 June 2009, Cavalcante was originally scheduled to face Renato Sobral at Strikeforce: Lawler vs. Shields, but Sobral pulled out due to personal reasons, and was replaced by Jared Hamman, who also pulled out, due to an injury. Cavalcante instead faced UFC veteran Mike Kyle. Cavalcante was handed his first decisive defeat, losing to Kyle via knockout.

On 15 May 2010 Cavalcante knocked out Antwain Britt at Strikeforce: Heavy Artillery to become the number one contender for the Strikeforce Light Heavyweight Championship.

Cavalcante fought against the heavily-touted Muhammed Lawal in Houston, Texas for the Strikeforce Light Heavyweight Championship, and defeated Lawal by TKO due to elbows from the clinch at 1:14 of round 3 to become the new Strikeforce Light Heavyweight Champion.

Cavalcante lost his title to Dan Henderson via third-round TKO, on 5 March 2011.

Cavalcante faced Yoel Romero on 10 September 2011 at Strikeforce: Barnett vs. Kharitonov. He won the fight via KO in the second round.

Feijao fought a rematch against Mike Kyle on 19 May 2012. He avenged his previous defeat by rocking Kyle with a knee and then choked him out with a guillotine choke after 33 seconds in the first round.  After the fight he tested positive for the banned substance stanozolol. As a result, the fight was overturned to a "no contest" by the CSAC and he was fined $2,500 and suspended for a year.

Ultimate Fighting Championship
Cavalcante made his anticipated UFC debut against Thiago Silva on 8 June 2013 at UFC on Fuel TV 10. Despite success early in the first round, Cavalcante lost via knock out at the end of the round. Though he lost, he still earned the Fight of the Night bonus along with Silva.

Cavalcante faced Igor Pokrajac on 9 November 2013 at UFC Fight Night 32. He won the fight via submission due to strikes in the first round.

Cavalcante faced Ryan Bader on 14 June 2014 at UFC 174. He lost the fight via unanimous decision.

Cavalcante faced Patrick Cummins on 1 August 2015 at UFC 190. He lost the back-and-forth fight by TKO due to elbows in the third round.

Cavalcante faced Ovince Saint Preux on 6 February 2016 at UFC Fight Night 82. He lost the fight by unanimous decision (30-27, 30-27, 29-28).
After his loss to Ovince Saint Preux, he was subsequently released from the promotion.

Bellator MMA
On 1 July 2017, Cavalcante defeated Dan Konecke via technical knockout in the first round to earn a Bellator MMA contract.

Personal life 
In June 2016, Cavalcante was involved in a bar fight at a country music bar in Cuiaba, Mato Grosso. In a police report, Cavalcante claims a man forcefully grabbed his girlfriend and along with a friend threatened to kill him. The other man stated Cavalcante verbally abused him and punched him in the face.

Championships and accomplishments
Strikeforce
Strikeforce Light Heavyweight Championship (One time)
Ultimate Fighting Championship
Fight of the Night (One time)
Sherdog
2010 All-Violence Second Team

Mixed martial arts record

|-
|Win
|align=center|13–7 (1)
|Dan Konecke
|TKO (punches)
|World Fight Tour 7: Road To Bellator
|
|align=center|1
|align=center|4:10
|Las Palmas, Gran Canaria, Spain
|
|-
|Loss
|align=center|12–7 (1)
|Ovince Saint Preux
|Decision (unanimous)
|UFC Fight Night: Hendricks vs. Thompson
|
|align=center|3
|align=center|5:00
|Las Vegas, Nevada, United States
|
|-
|Loss
|align=center|12–6 (1)
|Patrick Cummins
|TKO (elbows)
|UFC 190
|
|align=center|3
|align=center|0:45
|Rio de Janeiro, Brazil
|
|-
| Loss
| align=center| 12–5 (1)
| Ryan Bader
| Decision (unanimous)
| UFC 174
| 
| align=center| 3
| align=center| 5:00
| Vancouver, British Columbia, Canada
| 
|-
| Win
| align=center| 12–4 (1)
| Igor Pokrajac
| TKO (knees and punches)
| UFC Fight Night: Belfort vs. Henderson
| 
| align=center| 1
| align=center| 1:18
| Goiânia, Brazil
| 
|-
| Loss
| align=center| 11–4 (1)
| Thiago Silva
| KO (punches)
| UFC on Fuel TV: Nogueira vs. Werdum
| 
| align=center| 1
| align=center| 4:29
| Fortaleza, Brazil
| 
|-
| NC
| align=center| 11–3 (1) 
| Mike Kyle
| NC (overturned)
| Strikeforce: Barnett vs. Cormier
| 
| align=center| 1
| align=center| 0:33
| San Jose, California, United States
| 
|-
| Win
| align=center| 11–3
| Yoel Romero
| KO (punches)
| Strikeforce: Barnett vs. Kharitonov
| 
| align=center| 2
| align=center| 4:51
| Cincinnati, Ohio, United States
| 
|-
| Loss
| align=center| 10–3
| Dan Henderson
| TKO (punches)
| Strikeforce: Feijao vs. Henderson
| 
| align=center| 3
| align=center| 0:50
| Columbus, Ohio, United States
| 
|-
| Win
| align=center| 10–2
| Muhammed Lawal
| TKO (punches and elbows)
| Strikeforce: Houston
| 
| align=center| 3
| align=center| 1:14
| Houston, Texas, United States
| 
|-
| Win
| align=center| 9–2
| Antwain Britt
| KO (punches)
| Strikeforce: Heavy Artillery
| 
| align=center| 1
| align=center| 3:45
| St. Louis, Missouri, United States
|  
|-
| Win
| align=center| 8–2
| Aaron Rosa
| TKO (punches)
| Strikeforce Challengers: Woodley vs. Bears
| 
| align=center| 2
| align=center| 3:35
| Kansas City, Kansas, United States
| 
|-
| Loss
| align=center| 7–2
| Mike Kyle
| TKO (punches)
| Strikeforce: Lawler vs. Shields
| 
| align=center| 2
| align=center| 4:05
| St. Louis, Missouri, United States
| 
|-
| Win
| align=center| 7–1
| Travis Galbraith
| KO (knees)
| EliteXC: Unfinished Business
| 
| align=center| 1
| align=center| 3:01
| Stockton, California, United States
| 
|-
| Win
| align=center| 6–1
| Wayne Cole
| TKO (punches)
| EliteXC: Return of the King
| 
| align=center| 1
| align=center| 2:47
| Honolulu, Hawaii, United States
| 
|-
| Win
| align=center| 5–1
| John Doyle
| TKO (knee to the body)
| EliteXC: Street Certified
| 
| align=center| 1
| align=center| 2:17
| Miami, Florida, United States
| 
|-
| Loss
| align=center| 4–1
| Márcio Cruz
| DQ (illegal upkick)
| IFL: Las Vegas
| 
| align=center| 3
| align=center| 3:42
| Las Vegas, Nevada, United States
| 
|-
| Win
| align=center| 4–0
| Devin Cole
| TKO (punches)
| IFL: Atlanta
| 
| align=center| 2
| align=center| 0:26
| Atlanta, Georgia, United States
| 
|-
| Win
| align=center| 3–0
| Rubens Xavier
| TKO (Submission to punches)
| MF 5
| 
| align=center| 1
| align=center| 2:30
| São Paulo, Brazil
| 
|-
| Win
| align=center| 2–0
| Miodrag Petkovic
| TKO (knee and punches)
| WFC: Europe vs Brazil
| 
| align=center| 2
| align=center| 1:37
| Koper, Slovenia
| 
|-
| Win
| align=center| 1–0
| Eduardo Maiorino
| KO (punches)
| Pantanal Combat
| 
| align=center| 1
| align=center| 4:13
| Cuiabá, Brazil
|

See also
 List of current Bellator fighters
 List of male mixed martial artists

References

External links
 
 

1981 births
Living people
Brazilian male mixed martial artists
Brazilian sportspeople in doping cases
Light heavyweight mixed martial artists
Mixed martial artists utilizing Muay Thai
Mixed martial artists utilizing boxing
Mixed martial artists utilizing Brazilian jiu-jitsu
Strikeforce (mixed martial arts) champions
Ultimate Fighting Championship male fighters
Doping cases in mixed martial arts
Brazilian practitioners of Brazilian jiu-jitsu
People awarded a black belt in Brazilian jiu-jitsu
Brazilian Muay Thai practitioners
People from Ilha Solteira
Sportspeople from São Paulo (state)